Giana Romanova (born 10 March 1954) is a retired female middle distance runner who represented the USSR in the 1970s. She set her personal best in the women's 1500 metres (3:59.01) on 3 September 1978 at the European Championships in Prague, Czechoslovakia, winning the gold medal.

References

Profile

1954 births
Living people
Soviet female middle-distance runners
Ukrainian female middle-distance runners
European Athletics Championships medalists